Kunoy is a village, and seat of Kunoy Municipality in the Faroe Islands.

The village itself is located on the western shores of the island of Kunoy, which the town is named after. However, Kunoy is not the only town on the island; Haraldssund has, on the east shore of the island, is the only other settlement on the island, but in the 2018 census, both Haraldssund and Kunoy has the same number of inhabitants.

Kunoy
Populated places in the Faroe Islands